The 2010 Paradise Jam was an early-season men's and women's college basketball tournament. The tournament, which began in 2000, was part of the 2010-11 NCAA Division I men's basketball season and 2010-11 NCAA Division I women's basketball season.  The tournament was played at the Sports and Fitness Center in Saint Thomas, U.S. Virgin Islands. Old Dominion won the men's tournament, In the women's tournament Georgetown won the Island Division and West Virginia won the women's Reef Division.

Men's tournament

Women's tournament

The woman's tournament is organized as two divisions of four teams, each playing each other in a round-robin format.

Island Division 
On Thanksgiving, Tennessee beat Missouri 82–44, while Georgetown beat Georgia Tech 67–58. The next day, 12th ranked (AP) Georgetown lost to unranked Missouri 54–45, while Tennessee beat Georgia Tech 66–42. On the final day of the tournament, Georgia Tech beat Missouri, 61–46.

The other final game matched up Georgetown, with a 1–1 record, against Tennessee, who was ranked 4th in the AP poll. Georgetown's Sugar Rogers, who has not played particularly well in the first two game of the tournament, had 28 points to help lead her team to an upset victory over Tennessee. The Hoyas opened up with an 11–4 run and never trailed. Tennessee out rebounded Georgetown 42—24, but committed 29 turnovers. Both teams shot about 40% from the field, but the Hoyas had an advantage beyond the arc, hitting 10 of their 18 three point attempts, while the Volunteers hit only three of 18 attempts. The two team ended with 2–1 records, but with the head-to-head tie breaker, Georgetown was awarded the Island Division championship of the Paradise Jam.

Reef Division

References

Paradise Jam Tournament
Paradise Jam
Paradise Jam